The Nușfalău massacre occurred in the village of Szilágynagyfalu (today Nușfalău, Sălaj County, Romania) in Northern Transylvania. It happened on 8 September 1940, when a Hungarian soldier with the support of some natives tortured and killed eleven people (two women and nine men) of Romanian ethnicity from a nearby  village, who were passing through the area.

Background
At the Second Vienna Award of 30 August 1940, as a result of German–Italian arbitration, Romania was forced to cede to Hungary the northwestern part of Transylvania, which included Sălaj County, as well as the Székely Land. Under the terms of the award, Romania had 14 days to evacuate those territories and hand them over to Hungary, but Hungarian troops came across the border earlier, on 5 September. On 7 September, the Hungarian Second Army arrived at Șimleu Silvaniei and Ip, and on 8 September at Zalău, the seat of Sălaj County.

Massacre
On the morning of 8 September 1940, a group of eleven people of Romanian ethnicity were leaving the village of Szilágynagyfalu (Nușfalău), after spending the night there at the house of the mayor, Gheorghe Imrea. The group was composed of two women (Silvia Costaș and Maria Costea) and nine men (Traian Bencheu, Gavril Bogza, Dumitru Costaș, Nicolae Costaș, Dumitru Gaceu, Aurel Jarca, Vasile Matei, Dumitru Somei, and Gavril Turdea). While they were leaving the place, they were stopped by Zoltán Szinkovitz, a native Hungarian from the village, and a Hungarian soldier. They took the Romanians to the center of village and started registering them and confiscated their personal belongings. Then, the Romanians were beaten and injured with a bayonet. There, they were killed with a lunge in the heart with the bayonets. The two women were captured by two other Hungarian natives and were taken to the site of the massacre, where they were also killed. The corpses of the 11 victims were quickly buried and covered only with leaves; a proper burial in the cemetery of Nușfalău took place a few days later, at the insistence of the villagers, after the corpses had begun to decompose.

Trial
The facts were established by Decision no. 1 of the Northern Transylvania People's Tribunal (which sat in Cluj and was presided by Justice Nicolae Matei), in a public sentence from 13 March 1946. One of the accused, Zoltán Szinkovitz, was convicted of inciting and participating in the Nușfalău massacre. Two other ethnic Hungarians, Ioan Szabo and Ioan Fabian, were found guilty of aiding and abetting the crimes, and were punished, but the Hungarian soldier who bayonetted the male victims was never identified. One of the accused, Ioan F. Tütös (who was also present at the Nușfalău massacre), was acquitted of the charges.

See also
 List of massacres in Romania
 Ip massacre
 Treznea massacre

References

Massacres in 1940
World War II massacres
20th century in Transylvania
World War II crimes in Romania
Massacres in Hungary
1940 crimes in Romania
Massacres of Romanians
September 1940 events in Romania
1940 murders in Hungary
Hungarian war crimes